The 2016–17 Western Sydney Wanderers FC season was the club's fifth season since its establishment in 2012. The club participated in the A-League for the fifth time, the FFA Cup for the third time and the AFC Champions League for the third time.

Players

Squad information

From youth squad

Transfers in

Transfers out

Contract extensions

Technical staff

Statistics

Squad statistics

|-
|colspan="24"|Players no longer at the club:

Pre-season and friendlies

Competitions

Overall

A-League

League table

Results summary

Results by round

Matches

Finals series

FFA Cup

AFC Champions League

Group stage

References

External links
 Official Website

Western Sydney Wanderers
Western Sydney Wanderers FC seasons